Hearts in Atlantis is a 2001 American mystery drama film directed by Scott Hicks and starring Anthony Hopkins and Anton Yelchin. It is loosely adapted from Stephen King's Dark Tower tie-in Low Men in Yellow Coats, a novella in the 1999 collection Hearts in Atlantis after which the film was named.

The film is dedicated to cinematographer Piotr Sobociński, who died of a heart attack a few months before the release.

Plot
Middle-aged photographer and businessman Robert "Bobby" Garfield returns to his old hometown upon learning that his best friend, decorated soldier John "Sully" Sullivan, has died in a traffic accident and begins recollecting his past when he visits an abandoned house where he used to live. During a summer in the 1960s, an eleven-year-old Bobby lives with his widowed mother, self-centered Liz Garfield, and has two friends, Carol Gerber and Sully. They experienced many things together, the most mysterious of which was meeting an older gentleman named Ted Brautigan, whom Liz takes in as a boarder.

Ted takes the lonely Bobby under his wing, while his mother is busy with her job. The two form a father-son bond, and it slowly becomes evident that Ted has some psychic and telekinetic powers, which are the reason he has come to this sleepy town. In due course Ted explains that he has escaped the grasp of the "Low Men", strange people who would stop at nothing to get him back in their control.

After reading Bobby's mind and realizing that the boy dreams of owning a bicycle, Ted kindly offers Bobby $1 a week in exchange for his reading a newspaper out loud. Bobby quickly figures out that Ted has some other purpose in mind. Mysteriously, Ted asks Bobby to keep an eye on the neighborhood looking for any signs of the "low men", like announcements about missing pets. Bobby sees one, but does not tell Ted, afraid to lose his new friend.

Bobby, Carol and John have frequent conflicts with the local town bully, Harry Doolin, whom Ted scares away by looking into his mind and finding out that his violence is used to cover up his secret cross-dressing. However, at one point, Harry harasses and injures Carol, and when Ted manipulates her dislocated shoulder into place, Liz arrives, after being raped by her boss, and mistakenly believes that Ted is a child molester. She is confronted by Ted's ability to tell her the truth about what she has been through, and how her behavior is affecting her relationship with her son, providing another reason that Ted must leave. 
 
Ted is eventually captured with the help of a tip from Liz. As some form of closure, Ted yells to Bobby as he is being driven away that he wouldn't have missed a moment "not for all the world", and later Bobby mirrors the same feelings. Bobby is later confronted by Harry, but Bobby grabs the latter's baseball bat and beats him with it. Liz finds a new job in Boston and moves the family there. Before he leaves, Bobby and Carol say their goodbyes and share a final kiss.

Returning to the present, Bobby turns to leave his old home wherein he meets a young girl named Molly. The two strike up a conversation wherein Molly reveals that she is Carol's daughter and that Carol died in recent years. Bobby gives Molly a photograph of a young Carol and the two become friends.

Cast
 Anthony Hopkins as Ted Brautigan
 Anton Yelchin as Robert "Bobby" Garfield 
 David Morse as Adult Robert "Bobby" Garfield 
 Hope Davis as Elizabeth "Liz" Garfield
 Mika Boorem as Carol Gerber 
 Boorem also plays Molly, Carol's daughter, whom the adult Bobby meets in the present.
 Deirdre O'Connell as Mrs. Gerber
 Will Rothhaar as John "Sully" Sullivan
 Timmy Reifsnyder as Harry Doolin
 Alan Tudyk as Monte Man
 Tom Bower as Len Files
 Celia Weston as Alana Files
 Adam LeFevre as Don Biderman

Release

Box office
Hearts in Atlantis opened at #3 raking in $9,021,494 in its opening weekend at the U.S. box office. The film would eventually gross a domestic total of $24,185,781, somewhat short of its $31 million budget, but with an international $6,733,634, it would total $30,919,415.

Reception

Hearts in Atlantis received mixed reviews. On Rotten Tomatoes, it has an approval rating of 49% based on reviews from 137 critics, with an average score of 5.8/10 and the consensus states "Hearts in Atlantis is well-acted and beautiful to look at, but the movie is nothing more than a mood piece." According to Metacritic, which sampled the opinions of 30 critics and calculated a score of 55 out of 100, the film received "mixed or average reviews".

Roger Ebert gave it 3.5 out of 4 stars.

References

External links
 
 
 
 

2001 films
2001 thriller drama films
American mystery films
American thriller drama films
Australian thriller drama films
Films based on works by Stephen King
Films based on American horror novels
Films directed by Scott Hicks
Films set in 1960
Films set in Connecticut
Films shot in Virginia
Films with screenplays by William Goldman
Castle Rock Entertainment films
Village Roadshow Pictures films
Warner Bros. films
Films scored by Mychael Danna
2001 drama films
2000s English-language films
2000s American films